The Long Beach State Beach women's basketball team represents California State University, Long Beach in Long Beach, California. The school's team currently competes in the Big West Conference.

History
Since beginning in 1962, the 49ers have an all-time record (as of the end of the 2015–16 season) of 898–521. They played in the  Southern California Women’s Intercollegiate Athletic Conference from 1962 to 1965, the  Extramural Coordinating Council of Southern California Colleges from 1965 to 1971, and the SCWIAC from 1971 to 1976 before joining the Western Collegiate Athletic Association in 1976, playing until 1985.

They played in the AIAW women's basketball tournament (the predecessor to the NCAA Tournament) in 1972, 1973, 1976, 1979, 1980, and 1981. They were champion of the Western Collegiate Athletic Association for 1982–1985. They won the Pacific Coast Athletic Association (now known as the Big West Conference) title from 1987–89. The 49ers made the Final Four in 1987 and 1988. In 1987 (a year where they went 33–3), they beat Washington 72–57, Ole Miss 94–55 and Ohio State 102–82 to win the West Region. In the National Semifinal versus Tennessee, they lost 74–64. In 1988 (a year where they went 28–6), the 49ers beat Colorado 103–64, Washington 104–78, and Iowa 98–78 to win the West Region again. In the National Semifinal versus Auburn, they were beaten 68–55. Though they haven't reached an NCAA Tournament since 1992, they have played in the WNIT in 2000, 2013, 2015, 2016.

Year-by-year records

Postseason results

NCAA Division I
Long Beach State has appeared in a dozen NCAA tournaments, with a record of 18-12.

AIAW Division I
The Beach, then known as the 49ers, made six appearances in the AIAW National Division I basketball tournament, with a combined record of 6–9.

References

External links